Jiří Valenta may refer to:
 Jiří Valenta (footballer)
 Jiří Valenta (artist)